Thymesia is an action role-playing video game developed by Taiwanese developer, OverBorder Studio, and published by Team 17 for Microsoft Windows, PlayStation 5 and Xbox Series X/S alongside a cloud-based version for Nintendo Switch on August 18, 2022. Another cloud-based version for Amazon Luna was released on September 15, 2022. The game borrows mechanics from the Dark Souls series with both critics and the developers referring to the game as a soulslike.

Reception 

Thymesia received mixed reviews from critics, with the combat being generally praised, but the locations and story being criticized.

References 

2022 video games
Action role-playing video games
Fantasy video games
Nintendo Switch games
PlayStation 5 games
Single-player video games
Soulslike video games

Video games about alchemy
Windows games
Xbox Series X and Series S games